Pieve Emanuele railway station is a railway station in Italy. Located on the Milan–Genoa railway, it serves the municipality of Pieve Emanuele.

Services 
Pieve Emanuele is served by line S13 of the Milan suburban railway network, operated by the Lombard railway company Trenord.

See also 
 Milan suburban railway network

Notes

External links 

Railway stations in Lombardy
Milan S Lines stations
Railway stations opened in 2013